, often referred to as "body sushi", is the Japanese practice of serving sashimi or sushi from the naked body of a woman.  is the male equivalent.

History
The origin of nyotaimori can be traced back to the food play of  performed in Yūkaku during the Edo period, where sake would be poured into a sex worker's pubic region for drinking purposes. Fuelled by Japan's economic growth in the 1960s, this practice was further evolved by the hot spring bathing (onsen) industry in the Ishikawa Prefecture where the erotic nature of nyotaimori was used as an advertising tactic by the hot spring resorts to attract male customers who were on company trips to the region. The nyotaimori practice dwindled as family and private trips to the onsen destinations became increasingly popular in the 1980s and it was subsequently adopted by catering and sex establishments as an exotic attraction.

Due to the lack of primary sources, the misconceptions of nyotaimori's origin persisted when the practice became internationally known through popular culture.

Procedures
In traditional nyotaimori, the model is generally expected to lie still at all times and usually not talk with guests. The sushi is placed on sanitized leaves on the model's body to prevent skin-to-fish contact and on sufficiently flat areas of the body which the sushi will not roll off. Nyotaimori is considered an art form.

Usually, champagne and sake are served in naked sushi restaurants. Guests must be respectful and observe the strictest decorum. Talking with the models is highly discouraged. Inappropriate gestures or comments are not tolerated and diners can only pick up sushi with chopsticks, although rules in some restaurants are less strict. For example, in some restaurants, guests can nibble nori rolls off nipples if they choose.

Reception outside Japan

The practice has been criticized as being decadent, humiliating, degrading, cruel, antiquated, objectifying, and sexist.

Several countries have banned the practice. In 2005, China outlawed nyotaimori on naked bodies, condemning it due to public health reasons and moral issues.

See also
 Breastaurant
 Food play
 Human furniture
 Sushi Girl

References

External links

Nyotaimori video
"What is Nyotaimori?"

Body art
Japanese sex terms
Nudity
Sexual acts
Sexual fetishism
Sushi
Serving and dining